Kim Jun-ho is a Korean name consisting of the family name Kim and the given name Joon-ho, and may also refer to:

 Kim Jun-ho (comedian) (born 1975), South Korean comedian
 Kim Jun-ho (sport shooter) (born 1959), North Korean sports shooter
 Juno (singer) (born 1986), South Korean singer
 Kim Jun-ho (fencer) (born 1994), South Korean fencer
 Kim Jun-ho (speed skater) (born 1995), South Korean speed skater
 Kim Jun-ho (footballer) (born 2002), South Korean footballer